The women's shot put at the 1958 European Athletics Championships was held in Stockholm, Sweden, at Stockholms Olympiastadion on 23 August 1958.

Medalists

Results

Final
23 August

Participation
According to an unofficial count, 12 athletes from 10 countries participated in the event.

 (1)
 (1)
 (1)
 (1)
 (1)
 (2)
 (1)
 (1)
 (2)
 (1)

References

Shot put
Shot put at the European Athletics Championships
Euro